Fraser Dingwall (born 7 April 1999) is an English professional rugby union player who plays for Northampton Saints as a Centre.

Career
Dingwall attended Bedford School where he was Head of School. Dingwall first started playing rugby at Cambridge R.U.F.C. and joined Northampton Saints at the age of 14. In October 2018 Dingwall made his professional debut for Northampton in a Premiership game against Leicester Tigers.

At International level Dingwall captained the Scotland U18 side qualifying through his Scottish father. Dingwall scored a try for the England under-20 team against Ireland in the final round of the 2018 Six Nations Under 20s Championship as they finished runners up. He was included in the squad for the 2018 World Rugby Under 20 Championship and started in the final as England finished runners up to hosts France. He was chosen to captain England at the 2019 World Rugby Under 20 Championship and scored a try against Wales to secure fifth place.

Dingwall received his first call up to the senior England squad on 20 January 2020 for the 2020 Six Nations Championship.

In January 2023 Dingwall was suspended for three weeks following his sending-off for dangerous play in a Champions Cup match against La Rochelle.

References

External links
Northampton Saints profile

1999 births
Living people
English people of Scottish descent
English rugby union players
Northampton Saints players
People educated at Bedford School
Rugby union centres
Rugby union players from Cambridge